Spanish Catholic Movement (Movimiento Católico Español in Spanish, MCE) is a Spanish Catholic integralist and nationalist political party. The party also considers itself National Catholic and a follower of the ideas of José Antonio Primo de Rivera. The party uses the Cross of Saint James as its main symbol.

History
MCE was founded in 1981 as a splinter group from Fuerza Nueva, led by José Luis Corral. In the Spanish general elections of 1982 the party received 996 votes, less than 1% of the total. In the following years the MCE organized masses, tributes to the Blue Division veterans and to the "fallen for Spain", as well as numerous rallies against abortion.
The party has its ideological roots in Spanish Action and Spanish Renovation, Social Catholic, Integralist and Traditionalist organizations during Spanish Civil War. 
In the last 10 years the party has also organized acts against homosexuals or catalan independentism.

As of June 2016, the party is a member of the far-right coalition La España en Marcha.

References

External links
Movimientocatolico.es
Mce-aje.es

1981 establishments in Spain
Falangist parties
Far-right political parties in Spain
Political parties established in 1981